Robert Sopuck (born July 11, 1951) is a Canadian politician who served as a Member of Parliament in the House of Commons of Canada from 2010 to 2019. First elected in a by-election on November 29, 2010, Sopuck represented the riding of Dauphin—Swan River—Marquette from 2010 to 2015 and the riding of Dauphin—Swan River—Neepawa from 2015 to 2019. He is a member of the Conservative Party of Canada.

Biography

Education
Robert Sopuck received his Bachelor of Science from the University of Manitoba in 1973 and Master of Science from Cornell University (1975) in Ithaca, New York.

Fisheries biology and conservation
His first career (1976–1979) was in fisheries management where he was the district biologist (Eastern Arctic) for the federal Department of Fisheries and Oceans and then as fisheries biologist for the province of Manitoba. For a number of years he ran his grain farm and an outfitting business near Riding Mountain National Park.

From 1988 to 1996 he coordinated the sustainable development initiative for the province of Manitoba, serving as Manitoba's observer on the founding board of the International Institute for Sustainable Development. In 1996 he took a position with the Pine Falls Paper Company as director of environmental programs. He was also on the board of the Manitoba Habitat Heritage Corporation at this time.

Sopuck was the Vice-President of Policy (Western Canada) for the Delta Waterfowl Foundation from 2000 to 2009, and the Director of the "Smart Green" environmental policy project and the "Rural Renaissance Project" for the Frontier Centre for Public Policy. He chaired the board of the Manitoba fisheries development group known as the Fish and Lake Improvement Program for the Parkland Region.  During the winter of 2009/2010, he was a natural resources specialist with AMEC Earth and Environmental Limited and supervised an oil exploration and drilling program in Alberta.

In October 2007 he was appointed by the Minister of the Environment to the National Round Table on the Environment and the Economy. He has operated a grain and oilseed farm, a small outfitting business, and carried out consulting work in the areas of environmental assessment and resource management.  Sopuck's passion and experience in conservation, biology, and farming has led to becoming known as "the right-wing environmentalist."

Columnist and author
Throughout his professional career, Sopuck also served as the hunting and outdoors columnist for the Winnipeg Free Press. Sopuck's articles featured a variety of perspectives on the rural Canadian way of life.

In November 2014, Sopuck announced that he was publishing his first book, A Life Outdoors: Essays on Hunting, Gathering and Country Living in the 21st Century. The book features a collection of his articles written for the Winnipeg Free Press, recipes featuring wild game meat, and new essays.

Election and parliamentary work

2010 to 2015
With Inky Mark announcing that he would be resigning as the MP for Dauphin—Swan River—Marquette in June 2009, Prime Minister Stephen Harper called a by-election to be held on November 29, 2010.  Sopuck was acclaimed as the Conservative candidate, and won the by-election with over 56% of the vote. In the 2011 federal election, Sopuck increased his vote count, with over 63% of the vote.

From 2010 to 2015, Sopuck was a member of the Standing Committee for Environment and Sustainable Development and the Standing Committee on Fisheries and Oceans. In addition, he chaired the Manitoba Regional Caucus, which was the group of Conservative MPs representing Manitoba electoral districts who met before national caucus meetings.

From 2011 to 2013 Sopuck served as Chair of the Canada-Ukraine Parliamentary Friendship Group. This is a non-partisan group open to all Parliamentarians seeking to promote positive relations between Canada and Ukraine.  Conservative MP Ted Opitz took over as Chair from Sopuck in 2013.

In 2012, Sopuck was instrumental in founding the Conservative Hunting and Angling Caucus. The caucus, which has since grown to over 30 Conservative Members of Parliament, serves as a venue for Members of Parliament to discuss the common concerns of their constituents and move forward with solutions from the government that respect hunters and anglers. It also serves in an outreach role to meet with hunters, anglers, and trappers across the country to ensure their wealth of knowledge on environmental conservation is heard by our government. Sopuck is the chair of this caucus.

2015 federal election

In the summer of 2014, Sopuck was confirmed as the Conservative candidate for the new riding of Dauphin—Swan River—Neepawa. Despite the Conservatives losing almost 40 percent of their seats nationally, Sopuck comfortably won the riding for the Conservatives with over 46 percent of the vote.

42nd Canadian Parliament

With the Conservatives being elected as the Official Opposition and Rona Ambrose being elected as interim Leader, on November 20, 2015, Sopuck was appointed as the Critic for Wildlife Conservation and Parks Canada.

Sopuck did not run for re-election in the 2019 federal election.

Awards
In February 2008, Sopuck was awarded the Outdoor Heritage Award from the Manitoba Wildlife Federation. The award thanked him “For protecting and enhancing our hunting heritage and passing on these traditions in good health to future generations.”

In 2013, Sopuck was awarded the Queen's Diamond Jubilee Medal. It was awarded to "honour significant contributions and achievements by Canadians."

In June 2014, Sopuck received the Canadian Wildlife Federation's Past Presidents' Award, which is awarded to "elected legislators for their contributions to the conservation of wildlife in Canada."

Personal
He currently resides on his farm in the Sandy Lake area of Manitoba with his wife, Caroline. He has two children and three grandchildren.

Electoral record

References

1951 births
Conservative Party of Canada MPs
Canadian people of Ukrainian descent
Living people
Members of the House of Commons of Canada from Manitoba
Politicians from Winnipeg
Cornell University alumni
University of Manitoba alumni
20th-century Canadian civil servants
Canadian marine biologists
Canadian conservationists
Canadian farmers
21st-century Canadian politicians